Holme Abbey is a civil parish in the Borough of Allerdale in Cumbria, England.  It contains 15 listed buildings that are recorded in the National Heritage List for England.  Of these, one is listed at Grade I, the highest of the three grades, one is at Grade II*, the middle grade, and the others are at Grade II, the lowest grade.  The parish contains the village of Abbeytown and smaller settlements, and is otherwise rural.  The most important building in the parish was Holmcultram Abbey part of which has been converted into a parish church, and other parts have been used in other buildings.  Most of the other listed buildings are houses and associated structures, farmhouses and farm buildings.


Key

Buildings

References

Citations

Sources

Lists of listed buildings in Cumbria